Mann Ki Baat is an Indian radio programme hosted by Prime Minister Narendra Modi in which he addresses the people of the nation on All India Radio, DD National and DD News. Since the first show on 3 October 2014, there have been 97 episodes. The 97th episode has been aired on 29 January 2023.

The main purpose of the program is to "establish a dialogue with the citizens on issues of day-to-day governance", according to a statement by the Information and Broadcasting Minister in the Rajya Sabha in July 2021. The programme is India's "first visually enriched radio program".

Background 
The Prime Minister, Narendra Modi addresses the nation every month on All India Radio. Having officially started from 3 October 2014, the programme aims to deliver the Prime Minister's voice and ideas to the general masses of India. Since television connection is still not available everywhere in India, especially in the isolated, rural and less developed regions, radio was chosen to be the medium for the programme, owing to its wider reach. An estimated 90% of the total Indian population is reachable over the medium. Doordarshan's Direct to Home (DTH) service free dish relays feeds of the 20-minute-long episodes, to television and radio channels.

The first Mann Ki Baat programme was broadcast on the occasion of Vijayadashami on 3 October 2014 followed by the second broadcast on 2 November 2014.

In the first fifteen addresses of Mann ki Baat broadcast, more than 61,000 ideas were received on the website and 1.43 lakh audio recordings by listeners have been received. Each month, some selected calls become a part of the broadcast. From 2 June 2017, Mann Ki Baat will be available in regional dialects. The aim is to expand reach of the program as far as possible. The 50th episode of the program was broadcast on All India Radio on 25 November 2018.

Reception
The programme has been well received by the target audience, especially the urban masses residing in metropolitan cities across the country. A survey in 2014 conducted on the lines of estimating the show's success, in 6 Indian cities including Mumbai and Chennai, has indicated that some 66.7% of the population had tuned in to listen to the Prime Minister's address and had found it useful.

In 2017, an AIR survey found that the maximum listeners came from the Bihar, Gujarat and Madhya Pradesh; while the states of Andhra Pradesh and Arunachal Pradesh had the lowest awareness.

Mann Ki Baat became a major source of revenue for the All India Radio.

The 68th episode on 30 August 2020, uploaded on the official YouTube channel of the Bharatiya Janata Party, received over 500,000 thousands dislikes within 24 hours for reportedly not addressing issues related to postponement of JEE (Mains) and NEET (UG) exams. The video has become the most disliked videos on the official YouTube channel of BJP and one of the most disliked videos on YouTube with over 1.2 million dislikes. During the 72nd episode on 27 December 2020, farmers taking part in the 2020–2021 Indian farmers' protest were beating utensils in protest against the farm laws, symbolically drowning out the Prime Minister's voice.

Guests 
The former President of the United States, Barack Obama, was a part of the fourth episode of Mann Ki Baat, which was aired on 27 January 2015. Obama had arrived in India to be a part of the Republic Day Parade. On 29 September 2019, Lata Mangeshkar was a special guest on the show. Guests such as doctors and listeners have been called on the show to interact with Modi.

Research and analysis 
A week before the PM's 50th 'Mann ki Baat' a telephonic study was carried out by All India Radio. The campaigns mentioned by Modi which had the most impact on listeners were Selfie with Daughter, Incredible India, Fit India and Sandesh to Soldiers. The most remembered topics were the promotion of Khadi, Drug Free India and Team Tarini.

Following the 60th episode on 29 December 2019, Hindustan Times did a word cloud analysis of Mann Ki Baat. The words "India" and "nation" were the two most used words in Mann Ki Baat in 2019. "Water" was used 73 times while "Youth" and "Young" were mentioned 30 and 54 times. "Economy" or "economics" was spoken 8 times.

Episodes

List of episodes in 2014

List of episodes in 2015

List of episodes in 2016

List of episodes in 2017

List of episodes in 2018

List of episodes in 2019

List of episodes in 2020

List of episodes in 2021

Gallery

References and notes

Notes

References

Bibliography

External links 

 
 Webcasts
 http://www.pmindia.gov.in/en/mann-ki-baat

All India Radio
State media
Narendra Modi
Modi administration initiatives